The turquoise monitor (Varanus caerulivirens) is a species of monitor lizards found in Indonesia. Specifically, it is found on Halmahera Island and in the Maluku Islands.

Description
The main coloration of the turquoise monitor is black-brown and greyish-brown with some turquoise pattern. The underside coloration is light yellowish to turquoise with a blackish pattern. The throat and lower part of the neck of this monitor lizard is mostly yellowish. Varanus caerulivirens can grow up to about 110 cm in total length.

The diet of Varanus caerulivirens mainly consists of crustaceans, scorpions, grasshoppers and frogs.

References

 Varanidae.org

Further reading 
 Ast, Jennifer C. 2001. Mitochondrial DNA Evidence and Evolution in Varanoidea (Squamata). Cladistics 17 (3): 211-226 [erratum in 18 (1):125]
 Koch A, Arida E, Schmitz A, Böhme W, Ziegler T. 2009. Refining the polytypic species concept of mangrove monitors (Squamata: Varanus indicus group): a new cryptic species from the Talaud Islands, Indonesia, reveals the underestimated diversity of Indo-Australian monitor lizards. Australian Journal of Zoology 57(1): 29-40
 Lisle, H. de 2007. Varanus caerulivirens (Turquoise Monitor). Reproduction. Biawak 1 (1): 39-40
 PHILIPP, K. M., ZIEGLER, T. & W. BÖHME 1999. Der Türkiswaran Varanus caerulivirens ZIEGLER, BÖHME & PHILIPP, 1999. Herpetofauna 21 (122): 10-11
 Philipp,K.M.; Ziegler, T. & Böhme, W. 2007. Preliminary Investigations of the Natural Diet of Six Monitor Lizard Species of the Varanus (Euprepiosaurus) indicus Group. Mertensiella 16: 336-345
 Ziegler, T., Schmitz, A., Koch, A. & W. Böhme 2007. A review of the subgenus Euprepiosaurus of Varanus (Squamata: Varanidae): morphological and molecular phylogeny, distribution and zoogeography, with an identification key for the members of the V. indicus and the V. prasinus species groups. Zootaxa 1472: 1-28
 Ziegler, T., W. Böhme & K. M. Philipp 1999. Varanus caerulivirens sp. n., a new monitor lizard of the V. indicus group from Halmahera, Moluccas, Indonesia (Squamata: Sauria: Varanidae). Herpetozoa 12 (1/2): 45-56

Reptiles of Indonesia
Reptiles described in 1999
Varanus